Sillanwali  (Punjabi) is a town of Sargodha District in the Punjab province of Pakistan. The town is tehsil headquarters of Sillanwali Tehsil.

References

Populated places in Sargodha District